Ferrari Fairtex (เฟอรารี่ แฟร์เท็กซ์) is a Thai Muay Thai fighter. He currently competes in the Bantamweight division for ONE Championship. As of November 24, 2022, he is ranked #5 in the ONE Bantamweight Kickboxing rankings.

Biography and career
On March 21, 2022 Ferrari defeated Tapaokaew Singmawynn by decision at Rajadamnern Stadium. This win positioned him as a strong candidate for the Sports Writers Association of Thailand Fighter of the Year award.

Ferrari faced Han Zihao at ONE 161 on September 29, 2022. At the weigh-ins, Han Zihao weighed in at 153.75 lb, 8.75 lb over the bantamweight non-title fight limit of 145 pounds. the bout agreed to moved to the featherweight division (145–155 lbs) where Han was fined 30%, which went to Ferrari Fairtex. He won the bout via unanimous decision.

Ferrari faced Fabio Reis on February 10, 2023, at ONE Friday Fights 4. He lost the fight via knockout in the second round.

Ferrari is scheduled to face Felipe Lobo on April 22, 2023, at ONE Fight Night 9.

Titles and accomplishments
Channel 7 Boxing Stadium
 2018 Channel 7 Stadium 135lbs Champion

International Federation of Muaythai Associations
 2019 IFMA World Championships -63.5kg 
Awards
 2021 Sports Writers Association of Thailand Fighter of the Year

Fight record

|-  style="background:#;"
| 2023-04-22 ||   ||align=left| Felipe Lobo||  ONE Fight Night 9 ||  ||   ||   || 
|-  style="background:#fbb;"
| 2023-02-10|| Loss ||align=left| Fabio Reis|| ONE Friday Fights 4, Lumpinee Stadium || Bangkok, Thailand || KO (punch) || 2 || 2:30

|-  style="background:#cfc"
| 2022-10-22 ||Win ||align=left| Tapaokaew Singmawynn  || Ruamponkon Samui: Samui Super Fight, Petchbuncha Stadium || Ko Samui, Thailand || Decision ||5  ||3:00 

|-  style="background:#cfc;"
| 2022-09-29 || Win ||align=left| Han Zihao || ONE 161 || Kallang, Singapore || Decision (Unanimous) || 3|| 3:00
|-
|-  style="background:#cfc"
| 2022-07-06 || Win ||align=left| Phet-Utong Sor.Sommai || Muaythai Palangmai, Rajadamnern Stadium || Bangkok, Thailand || TKO (Referee stoppage) || 4 || 
|-  style="background:#fbb"
| 2022-05-09 || Loss||align=left| Tapaokaew Singmawynn  || Satun Super Fight || Satun province, Thailand ||Decision || 5 ||3:00 
|-  style="background:#cfc"
| 2022-03-21 || Win ||align=left| Tapaokaew Singmawynn || Singmawin, Rajadamnern Stadium || Bangkok, Thailand || Decision || 5 || 3:00

|-  style="background:#cfc;"
| 2022-01-09|| Win ||align=left| Sangmanee Sor Tienpo || Channel 7 Boxing Stadium || Bangkok, Thailand || Decision || 5 || 3:00 
|-  style="background:#cfc;"
| 2021-11-16 ||Win ||align=left| Nuenglanlek Jitmuangnon|| Lumpinee GoSport + Kiatpetch, Lumpinee Stadium|| Bangkok, Thailand || Decision || 5 ||3:00
|-  style="background:#fbb;"
| 2021-10-17|| Loss ||align=left| Tapaokaew Singmawynn || Channel 7 Boxing Stadium|| Bangkok, Thailand || Decision|| 5 || 3:00
|-  style="background:#cfc;"
|-  style="background:#cfc;"
| 2021-03-14|| Win ||align=left| Rittewada Sitthikul || Channel 7 Boxing Stadium || Bangkok, Thailand || Decision|| 5 || 3:00
|-  style="background:#cfc;"
| 2021-02-14|| Win||align=left| Yodlekpet Or. Pitisak || Channel 7 Boxing Stadium|| Bangkok, Thailand ||Decision (Majority)||5 ||3:00
|-  style="background:#cfc;"
| 2020-12-13 || Win||align=left| Thaksinlek Kiatniwat  || Channel 7 Boxing Stadium || Bangkok, Thailand || Decision || 5 || 3:00
|-  style="background:#cfc;"
| 2020-02-09||Win ||align=left|  Muangthai PKSaenchaimuaythaigym || Srithammaracha + Kiatpetch Super Fight || Nakhon Si Thammarat, Thailand ||Decision|| 5 ||3:00
|-  style="background:#cfc;"
| 2020-01-10 || Win ||align=left| Thaksinlek Kiatniwat  || Rajadamnern Stadium || Bangkok, Thailand || Decision || 5 || 3:00
|-  style="background:#fbb;"
| 2019-10-05 || Loss ||align=left| Muangthai PKSaenchaimuaythaigym  ||  Suek Muay Thai Vithee || Buriram, Thailand || Decision  || 5 || 3:00
|-  style="background:#cfc;"
| 2019-09-13 || Win||align=left| Shadow Suanaharnpeekmai  ||  Samui Festival + Kiatpetch || Ko Samui, Thailand || Decision  || 5 || 3:00
|-  style="background:#cfc;"
| 2019-06-26 || Win||align=left| Mahadet Chor.Archariya  || RuamponkonSamui + Kiatpetch Super Fight. || Surat Thani, Thailand || Decision  || 5 || 3:00
|-  style="background:#fbb;"
| 2019-05-10 || Loss||align=left| Shadow Suanaharnpeekmai || Lumpinee Stadium || Bangkok, Thailand || Decision || 5 || 3:00
|-  style="background:#fbb;"
| 2019-03-19|| Loss||align=left| Kulabdam Sor.Jor.Piek-U-Thai || Lumpinee Stadium || Bangkok, Thailand || Decision || 5 || 3:00
|-
! style=background:white colspan=9 |
|-  style="background:#cfc;"
| 2019-02-10|| Win ||align=left| Inseethong Por.Peenapat|| OrTorGor.3 Stadium || Nonthaburi, Thailand || Decision || 5 || 3:00
|-  style="background:#fbb;"
| 2018-12-02 || Loss||align=left| Sittisak Petpayathai || Channel 7 Boxing Stadium || Bangkok, Thailand || Decision || 5 || 3:00
|-  style="background:#cfc;"
| 2018-09-26 || Win||align=left| Patakthep SinbiMuayThai  ||  Kiatpetch + Samui Super Fight || Ko Samui, Thailand || KO || 5 ||
|-  style="background:#cfc;"
| 2018-08-12|| Win ||align=left|  Jamesak SuperMuay || Channel 7 Boxing Stadium|| Bangkok, Thailand || Decision || 5 || 3:00
|-
! style=background:white colspan=9 |
|-  style="background:#cfc;"
| 2018-07-06|| Win ||align=left| Monkaw MUden ||RuamponkonSamui || Ko Samui, Thailand || Decision || 5 || 3:00
|-  style="background:#fbb;"
| 2018-06-05|| Loss||align=left| Tawanchai PK Saenchaimuaythaigym || Lumpinee Stadium || Bangkok, Thailand || Decision || 5 || 3:00
|-  style="background:#fbb;"
| 2018-05-01|| Loss||align=left| Yok Parunchai || Lumpinee Stadium || Bangkok, Thailand || Decision || 5 || 3:00
|-  style="background:#cfc;"
| 2018-03-06|| Win||align=left| Sibsaen Tor.Aiwcharoenthongphuket || Lumpinee Stadium || Bangkok, Thailand || Decision || 5 || 3:00 
|-
! style=background:white colspan=9 |
|-  style="background:#cfc;"
| 2018-01-05|| Win||align=left| Sakchanoi MUden || Lumpinee Stadium || Bangkok, Thailand || Decision || 5 || 3:00
|-  style="background:#cfc;"
| 2017-12-08|| Win||align=left| Taladkaek Saksamrit || Kiatpetch + Lumpinee Stadium 61st Birthday Anniversary || Bangkok, Thailand || Decision || 5 || 3:00
|-  style="background:#fbb;"
| 2017-11-04|| Loss||align=left| Taladkaek Saksamrit || Lumpinee Stadium  || Bangkok, Thailand || Decision || 5 || 3:00
|-  style="background:#cfc;"
| 2017-08-25|| Win ||align=left| Petchpradit MUden || Lumpinee Stadium  || Bangkok, Thailand || Decision || 5 || 3:00
|-  style="background:#cfc;"
| 2017-07-23|| Win ||align=left| Pornchainoi Mor.Rattanabundit || Channel 7 Boxing Stadium  || Bangkok, Thailand || KO || 4 ||
|-  style="background:#cfc;"
| 2017-06-03|| Win ||align=left| Jancherng Theglaff Pattaya || Lumpinee Stadium  || Bangkok, Thailand || Decision || 5 || 3:00
|-  style="background:#c5d2ea;"
| 2017-04-30|| Draw||align=left| Ponchainoi Teeded 99 || Jitmuagnon Stadium  || Bangkok, Thailand || Decision || 5 || 3:00
|-  style="background:#fbb;"
| 2017-03-04|| Loss ||align=left| Kunhanlek Kiatjaroenchai || Lumpinee Stadium  || Bangkok, Thailand || KO || 5 ||
|-  style="background:#cfc;"
| 2017-02-08|| Win ||align=left| Phetpadong Phetsimean || Rajadamnern Stadium  || Bangkok, Thailand || KO (Elbow) || 2 ||
|-  style="background:#cfc;"
| 2017-01-17|| Win ||align=left| Phetnumchai Naratreekul   || Lumpinee Stadium  || Bangkok, Thailand|| Decision || 5 || 3:00
|-  style="background:#fbb;"
| 2016-12-16|| Loss ||align=left| Phetputhai Eminentair|| Lumpinee Stadium  || Bangkok, Thailand|| Decision || 5 || 3:00
|-  style="background:#fbb;"
| 2016-10-09|| Loss||align=left| Ratanaphon Kiatphontip || Rajadamnern Stadium  || Bangkok, Thailand || Decision || 5 || 3:00

|-
| colspan=9 | Legend:    

|-  bgcolor="#fbb"
| 2019-07-26 || Loss||align=left| Igor Liubchenko || 2019 IFMA World Championship, Semi Final|| Bangkok, Thailand || Decision (29-28)|| 3 || 3:00 
|-
! style=background:white colspan=9 |

|-  bgcolor="#CCFFCC"
| 2019-07-25 || Win||align=left| Celestin Mendes || 2019 IFMA World Championship, Quarter Final|| Bangkok, Thailand || Decision (30-26)|| 3 || 3:00

|-  bgcolor="#CCFFCC"
| 2019-07-24 || Win||align=left| Adilbek Nurmetov || 2019 IFMA World Championship, Second Round|| Bangkok, Thailand || Decision (30-27)|| 3 || 3:00

|-  bgcolor="#CCFFCC"
| 2019-07-23 || Win||align=left| Mathias Jonsson || 2019 IFMA World Championship, First Round|| Bangkok, Thailand || Decision (30-27)|| 3 || 3:00

|-
| colspan=9 | Legend:

References

Ferrari Fairtex
Ferrari Fairtex 
Living people
1997 births
Ferrari Fairtex